FC Zvezda Saint Petersburg is a Russian football club based in Saint Petersburg. It plays in the third-tier Russian Second League.

History
The team was licensed for Russian Professional Football League for the first time for the 2019–20 season.

Names
Trevis and VVK (2008 - 2014) 
FC Zvezda (since 2014)

Current squad
As of 22 February 2023, according to the Second League website.

Honours
North-West Football Championship of the Russian Amateur Football League
  Champion (5): 2012/2013, 2013, 2015, 2016, 2017
City Championship:
  Champion (8): 2010, 2011, 2012, 2013, 2014, 2015, 2016, 2017

References

External links
Official website 

Association football clubs established in 2008
Football clubs in Saint Petersburg
2008 establishments in Russia